Cliché Magazine is a digital fashion magazine with a focus on fashion, music, lifestyle, entertainment, and latest culture. Based in Los Angeles and Las Vegas, issues are released monthly, exclusively on digital platforms.

Basic information
The magazine was founded by former editor in chief Jeremy Fall, and premiered on June 1, 2009. Fall founded Cliché at age 18, initially as a side project while he was working as an event producer. According to Fall, the magazine reached 1 million unique views in December 2009. On June 1, 2011, after a year-long hiatus, the magazine was relaunched in a new format that allowed for audio and video embedding. Head photographer Dirk Mai produces cover editorials, as well as other exclusive content for the magazine.

Richard Corbett became the new proprietor of Cliché in December 2011 and Megan Portorreal took the reins as editor in chief of the magazine In October 2012, Wilson Greene joined the Cliché Team  as a Managing Partner and COO. Responsible for managing the day-to-day operations and to provide strategic direction for the company. In May 2012, Cliché added Quavondo Nguyen to their team as Creative Director. With a design and photography background, Quavondo was able to help provide creative insights to help the company re-brand its product. In the summer of 2013, Cliché Magazine relaunched with a new identity, including a new logo, a new website, and a new magazine look and feel. Quavondo is also the head photographer. He left Cliché in 2018 but returned in 2020 as Editor in Chief.

Print is Dead campaign/environmental efforts
In December 2009, the magazine released its "Print is Dead, Get Over It" campaign. In line with its eco-friendly mission, and in light of the online publication boom, Cliché offers print issues on demand. In addition to its website, Cliché is also available as an iPhone and iPod touch application.

Furthermore, its August 2009 issue – titled "The Green Issue" – focused on providing environmental conservation tips, as well as highlighting eco-friendly brands such as Tom's Shoes.

Other brands
In addition to the magazine, Cliché used to run the blog Hello Kitsch, which was presented in a daily format and included additional, more personal content between issues. Now all blog posts can be found directly on the site.

Cliché TV, was created as a way to promote independent artists, showcase webisodes, models and other video-related projects.

Cover models
Cliché's covers have featured a wide range of appearances, including Brittany Flickinger, Mandy Jiroux, Tiësto, actress Torrey DeVitto, and alternative band The Maine.

References

External links
Cliché Magazine's Official Website

Monthly magazines published in the United States
Online magazines published in the United States
Fashion magazines published in the United States
Magazines established in 2009
Magazines published in California
2009 establishments in the United States